Schlitzie (alternatively spelled Schlitze or Shlitze; September 10, 1901 – September 24, 1971), possibly born Simon Metz and legally Schlitze Surtees, was an American sideshow performer. He also appeared in a few films, and is best known for his role in the 1932 movie Freaks. His lifelong career on the outdoor entertainment circuit as a major sideshow attraction with Barnum & Bailey, among others, made him a popular cultural icon.

Biography
Schlitzie's true birth date, name, location and parents are unknown; the information on his death certificate and gravesite indicate that he was born on September 10, 1901, in The Bronx, New York, though some sources have claimed that he was born in Santa Fe, New Mexico. Claims that he was born in Yucatán, Mexico, are mistaken reflections of Schlitzie's occasional fanciful billing as "Maggie, last of the Aztec Children". Information about Schlitzie's identity at birth may never be known, the information having been lost as he was handed off to various carnivals in a long line of mostly informal guardianships throughout his career.

Schlitzie was born with microcephaly, a neurodevelopmental disorder that left him with an unusually small brain and skull, a small stature, myopia, and severe intellectual disability. It is possible that these features were caused by Seckel syndrome. It was said Schlitzie had the cognition of a three-year-old: he was unable to care fully for himself and could speak only in monosyllabic words and form a few simple phrases. However, he was able to perform simple tasks, and it is believed that he could understand most of what was said to him, as he had a very quick reaction time and the ability to mimic. Those who knew Schlitzie described him as an affectionate, exuberant, sociable person who loved dancing, singing, and being the center of attention, performing for anyone he could stop and talk with.

Career
In some sideshows, he was paired with another microcephalic performer.

Schlitzie was often dressed in a muumuu and presented as either female or androgynous to add to the mystique of his unusual appearance. Those who knew him alternately used masculine and feminine pronouns. His urinary incontinence, which obliged him to wear diapers, made dresses practical for his care needs, although it is possible that the incontinence did not develop until later in life and was simply a side-effect of age.

The sideshow circuit was a tremendous success for Schlitzie; throughout the 1920s and 1930s he was employed by many upscale circuses, including Ringling Bros. and Barnum & Bailey Circus, Clyde Beatty Circus, Tom Mix Circus, Crafts 20 Big Shows, and Foley & Burke Carnival. In 1928, Schlitzie made his film debut in The Sideshow, a drama set in a circus, which featured a variety of actual sideshow performers.

Freaks and later work
Schlitzie landed his best-known role as an actor in Tod Browning's 1932 horror film Freaks. Like The Sideshow, Freaks takes place at a carnival and features a number of genuine sideshow performers, including conjoined twins Daisy and Violet Hilton, "The Living Torso" Prince Randian, and dwarf siblings Harry and Daisy Earles. Schlitzie has a scene of (unintelligible) dialogue with actor Wallace Ford. Two other "pinheads" also appear in the film. When referring to Schlitzie, other actors use feminine pronouns.

When Freaks premiered in 1932, cinema audiences were scandalized by the appearance of sideshow performers. The United Kingdom banned the film for thirty years. The film was a financial failure, and Browning, although he went on to make several more films for MGM, retired in 1940.

Schlitzie appeared in bit roles in various movies and is credited with a role in the 1934 exploitation film Tomorrow's Children as a mentally defective criminal who undergoes forced sterilization.

While Schlitzie was performing with the Tom Mix Circus in 1935, George Surtees, a chimpanzee trainer with a trained-chimpanzee act in the show, adopted him, becoming his legal guardian. In 1941, Schlitzie appeared in his final film role as "Princess Bibi", a sideshow attraction, in Meet Boston Blackie.

Hospitalization
Under George Surtees' care, Schlitzie continued performing the sideshow circuit; after Surtees' death in 1965, his daughter, who was not in show business, committed Schlitzie to a Los Angeles county hospital.

Schlitzie remained hospitalized for some time until he was recognized by sword swallower Bill "Frenchy" Unks, who happened to be working at the hospital during the off-season. According to Unks, Schlitzie seemed to miss the carnival badly, and being away from the public eye had made him very depressed. Hospital authorities determined that the best care for Schlitzie would be to make him a ward of Unks' employer, showman Sam Alexander, and return him to the sideshow, where he remained until 1968.

Final years
In his later years, Schlitzie lived in Los Angeles, occasionally performing on various sideshow circuits both locally and internationally (he frequently performed in Hawaii and London, and his last major appearance was at the 1968 Dobritch International Circus held at the Los Angeles Sports Arena). Schlitzie also became a notable attraction performing on the streets of Hollywood, with his caretakers selling his stock carnival souvenir pictures. Schlitzie spent time in his final days on Santa Monica Boulevard. He liked going to MacArthur Park at Alvarado Street and Wilshire Boulevard, where he would visit the lake with his guardian, feeding the pigeons and ducks and performing for passersby.

Death
On September 24, 1971, at seventy years old, Schlitzie died at Fountain View Convalescent Home. His death certificate listed his official name as "Shlitze Surtees" and his birthdate as 1901. Schlitzie was interred at Queen of Heaven Cemetery in Rowland Heights.

Cultural legacy
In the 1960s, Freaks was rediscovered and enjoyed a long run as one of the first midnight movies, becoming a cult classic, and in 1994 it was selected by the National Film Registry as being "culturally, historically, or aesthetically significant". The film became the public's major exposure to Schlitzie, who remains one of the more memorable characters in the film.

Schlitzie's iconic image has lent itself to many products, including masks, hats, shirts, models, clocks, snow globes, and dolls. Additionally, Schlitzie has been cited as an inspiration for Bill Griffith's comic strip Zippy the Pinhead, as well as the circus freak Bertram in Red Dead Redemption 2. In 2019, Griffith released Nobody's Fool, a graphic novel biography of Schlitzie.

The Ramones song "Pinhead," from the 1977 album Leave Home, was inspired by him.

Filmography

References

External links
 
 Portrait (2009) of Schlitzie by illustrator Drew Friedman
 The Human Marvels Biography

1901 births
1971 deaths
Entertainers with dwarfism
Male actors from New York City
Sideshow performers
Actors with dwarfism
Deaths from pneumonia in California
Entertainers from the Bronx
20th-century American male actors
People with microcephaly